Palookaville is the fourth and final studio album by English electronic music producer Fatboy Slim. It was first released on 4 October 2004 in the United Kingdom by Skint Records and a day later in the United States by Astralwerks. The album was nominated for the 2006 Grammy Award for Best Electronic/Dance Album.

Promotion
Football club Brighton and Hove Albion F.C. temporarily named their Withdean Stadium after the name of that album following their sponsorship deal with Skint Records.

Critical reception
Palookaville was met with "mixed or average" reviews from critics. At Metacritic, which assigns a weighted average rating out of 100 to reviews from mainstream publications, this release received an average score of 53 based on 24 reviews.

In a review for AllMusic, critic reviewer David Jeffries wrote: "Palookaville could stand one more trimming pass, but it gives Cook's canon the needed depth. Now there's a Fatboy Slim record for that rainy day and one the long-haired freaky people can enjoy."

Track listing

Personnel 

 Norman Cook - samples, keyboards, synthesizer, programming, bass
 Simon Thornton - guitar, mixing, engineering
 Damon Albarn - vocals on "Put It Back Together"
 Lateef the Truthspeaker - vocals on "Wonderful Night" and "The Journey"
 Justin Robertson - vocals, bass and guitar on "Push and Shove"
 Sharon Woolf - additional vocals on "Put It Back Together" and "Push and Shove"
 Bootsy Collins - vocals on "The Joker''"
 Jonny Quality - vocals and guitar on "Long Way from Home"

Charts

Certifications

References

External links 
 

2004 albums
Astralwerks albums
Fatboy Slim albums
Skint Records albums